Tarek Taha (born 4 April 1991) is an Egyptian footballer who plays for Egyptian team Pyramids as a left-back.

Career
Taha joined Ismaily SC from Smouha SC in 2018. He was Ismaily's most expensive transfer that season, costing EGP1.2m.

Taha scored the only goal in Ismaily's first round CAF Champions League game in 2018, a curling free kick which helped defeat Burundi's Le Messager. He made several other appearances for Ismaily in their Champions League run.

References

1991 births
Living people
Egyptian footballers
Association football fullbacks
Pyramids FC players
Ismaily SC players
Smouha SC players
El Entag El Harby SC players
Future FC (Egypt) players